Olivier Dussopt (born 16 August 1978 in Annonay, Ardèche) is a French politician who has been serving as the minister of labour, employment and integration in the government of Prime Minister Élisabeth Borne since 2022. He previously served as the minister of public action and accounts in the governments of successive prime ministers Édouard Philippe and Jean Castex from 2019 to 2022. He was a member of the National Assembly from 2007 to 2017

Career
Dussopt was a member of the Socialist Party from 2000 to 2017. From 2007 until 2017, he was a member of the National Assembly. In parliament, he served on the Committee on Economic Affairs (2007-2009) and the Committee on Legal Affairs (2009-2017). 

In addition to his parliamentary activities, Dussopt worked on Manuel Valls’ campaign team in the Socialist Party's primaries for the 2017 presidential election. Following the 2017 French legislative election, he was among a minority that voted against the Philippe government's proposal for the 2018 national budget.

On 27 November 2017, Dussopt was appointed by President Macron to the position of Secretary of State to the Ministry of Public Action and Accounts, under the leadership of minister Gérald Darmanin. Soon after that, he was expelled from the Socialist Party. On 24 December 2017 he resigned from the National Assembly.

In 2020, he created the new movement Territories of Progress with fellow minister Jean-Yves Le Drian.

Controversy
On 20 May 2020, French online investigative and opinion newspaper Mediapart revealed that the French utility company Saur gave him a present of lithographs by Gérard Garouste for a value of 2,000 euros in January 2017, just a few days before he announced a contract for a hydroelectric turbine with the same company in his town of Annonay.  

After the revelations, he initially answered that it was "A gift from a friend", but later  he recognized that it was a gift from the company, and he promised to give back the lithographs. Additionally, the Saur employee who gave him the gift declared that he was not a friend of Dussopt, but that Dussopt was just a client.

References

External links
Assemblée nationale profile 

1978 births
Living people
Deputies of the 13th National Assembly of the French Fifth Republic
Deputies of the 14th National Assembly of the French Fifth Republic
Deputies of the 15th National Assembly of the French Fifth Republic
French Ministers of Labour and Social Affairs
French political party founders
Mayors of places in Auvergne-Rhône-Alpes
People from Annonay
Socialist Party (France) politicians
Members of the Borne government
Deputies of the 16th National Assembly of the French Fifth Republic